A recreation reserve is a type of New Zealand protected area owned by the New Zealand Government and administered by the Department of Conservation as a facility for sporting or area for recreational activities.

Each recreation reserve has been established "for the purpose of providing areas for the recreation and sporting activities and the physical welfare and enjoyment of the public, and for the protection of the natural environment and beauty of the countryside, with emphasis on the retention of open spaces and on outdoor recreational activities, including recreational tracks in the countryside".

Land Information New Zealand lists 599 recreation reserves on its website.

References

Protected areas of New Zealand